Sultan of the Malwa Sultanate was the principal title of the ruler of the Malwa Sultanate (1401–1561/2) in the Indian subcontinent.
 The Sultanate was founded by Dilawar Khan, an Afghan or a Turko-Afghan governor of the Delhi Sultanate. In 1437, the Ghurid dynasty of Dilawar Khan was replaced by Turkic Khilji dynasty.

Sultan of the Malwa Sultanate

References

External links 

 Coins of the Malwa Sultanate
 Sultans of Malwa

History of Malwa
Islamic rule in the Indian subcontinent
History of Ujjain